Jan Weincke (born 30 April 1945) is a Danish cinematographer.

Filmography
Facing the Truth (2002)
Barbara (1997)
Inside (1996)
Pain of Love (1992)
Penn & Teller Get Killed (1989)
Dead of Winter (1987)
Weeds (1987)
Hello Again (1987)
Twist and Shout (1984)
Beauty and the Beast (1983)
Zappa (1983)
Tree of Knowledge (1981)
That's Me, Too (1980)

References

External links

Profile at Internet Encyclopedia of Cinematographers

1945 births
Danish cinematographers
Living people
Bodil Honorary Award recipients